Edward Frederick "Specs" Klieman (March 21, 1918 – November 15, 1979) was an American professional baseball pitcher. He played in Major League Baseball (MLB) in all or portions of eight seasons (1943–1950) for the Cleveland Indians, Washington Senators, Chicago White Sox and Philadelphia Athletics.  For his career, he compiled a 26–28 won–lost record, with 33 saves, in 222 appearances, with a 3.49 earned run average and 130 strikeouts.  Klieman was a relief pitcher on the 1948 World Series champion Indians, pitching in one World Series game, giving up three runs without recording an out.

Klieman was born in Norwood, Ohio. His 15-season career began in 1937 in the organization of the Cincinnati Reds, but Klieman would spend the bulk of his career with Ohio's American League team, the Indians, working in 197 games (with 32 starts) during his first six MLB seasons. Klieman became a relief specialist starting in 1946. In  he led the American League in games pitched (58) and saves (17). In , he teamed with Russ Christopher to give AL champion Cleveland an effective bullpen duo; he worked in 44 games and put up his best ERA (2.60), while contributing four saves. Although he was treated roughly by the Boston Braves in Game 5 of the 1948 Series, his teammates came back the following day to win the sixth game and the world championship.

That winter, he was included in a blockbuster trade with Washington that brought the Indians future Baseball Hall of Famer Early Wynn and seven-time AL All-Star Mickey Vernon. Klieman would appear in only two games for the Senators before his contract was sold to the White Sox in May 1949. He pitched effectively in relief for Chicago, winning his two decisions and posting a 3.00 ERA, but that December he was traded again, this time to the Philadelphia Athletics. However, Klieman was ineffective in five  relief appearances and was sent to the minor leagues, where he finished his pro career in 1951.

In his 542 innings pitched as a big leaguer, Klieman allowed 525 hits and 239 bases on balls, to go with his 130 strikeouts. In 32 assignments as a starting pitcher, he threw ten complete games and two shutouts.

Ed Klieman died in Homosassa, Florida, at the age of 61 on November 15, 1979.

See also
 List of Major League Baseball annual saves leaders

References

1918 births
1979 deaths
Baltimore Orioles (IL) players
Baseball players from Ohio
Cedar Rapids Raiders players
Charleston Senators players
Chicago White Sox players
Cleveland Indians players
Columbia Reds players
Fremont Reds players
Indianapolis Indians players
Jacksonville Tars players
Major League Baseball pitchers
People from Norwood, Ohio
Philadelphia Athletics players
Sacramento Solons players
Washington Senators (1901–1960) players